Raphitoma merignacensis is an extinct species of sea snail, a marine gastropod mollusc in the family Raphitomidae.

Description

Distribution
Fossils of this extinct marine species were found in Oligocene strata in France.

References

 Lozouet (P.), 2017 Les Conoidea de l’Oligocène supérieur (Chattien) du bassin de l’Adour (Sud-Ouest de la France). Cossmanniana, t. 19, p. 1-179

merignacensis
Gastropods described in 1931